Elections to Wiltshire County Council were held on Thursday, 5 May 1977.  The whole council of 79 members was up for election and the result was that the Conservatives took overall control, winning 57 seats, a gain of 17. They had previously had to rely on Independents. Labour ended with 14 county councillors, the Liberals and Independents four each.

The Chairman of the Council since 1973, Frank Willan, was re-elected and continued in office until 1979, when he was succeeded by Nigel Anderson.

Election result

|}

Notes

External links
Colin Rallings, Michael Thrasher, Wiltshire County Council election Results 1973–2005 at electionscentre.co.uk

1977
1977 English local elections
20th century in Wiltshire